Kenneth Wayne Moyer (born 1966) is a former professional American football player who played offensive lineman for five seasons for the Cincinnati Bengals.  He went to the University of Toledo where he got a bachelor's degree in Science and Electrical Engineering.  Ken Moyer became the head football coach at Dayton Christian High School in 2014 as well as teaching high school math classes.  Moyer coached and taught at Dayton Christian High School from 2014-2021, when he decided to become the football coach of Valley View High School in Germantown, Ohio.

References 

1966 births
Living people
People from Canoga Park, Los Angeles
Players of American football from Los Angeles
American football centers
American football offensive guards
American football offensive tackles
Toledo Rockets football players
Cincinnati Bengals players